Brian Nicolás Aguirre (born 6 January 2003) is an Argentine footballer who plays as a forward for Newell's Old Boys.

Club career
Aguirre joined Newell's Old Boys' youth academy in 2015. He made his first appearance for the senior squad on 26 April 2021 in a 1–2 loss against Gimnasia y Esgrima de La Plata for the Copa de la Liga Profesional. He renewed his contract with the club at the end of the season.

In September 2022, he suffered a knee injury that left him unable to play any game in the 2022 season.

International career
Aguirre was called up to the Argentina national under-20 football team for the 2022 Maurice Revello Tournament in France.

In January 2023, he was called up to the Argentina national under-20 football team ahead of the 2023 South American Championship.

Career statistics

Club

References

2003 births
Living people
Sportspeople from Santa Fe Province
Argentine footballers
Argentina youth international footballers
Association football forwards
Argentine Primera División players
Newell's Old Boys footballers